Per Torsvik (30 November 1925 – 1998) was a Norwegian political scientist and media scholar.

He held the mag.art. degree in political science, but is better known for founding media research in Norway. In 1958 he co-founded the Department of Press Research at the University of Oslo, and was the only employee for many years. He was later hired at the University of Bergen, at a "secretariat for media research" which was founded following a 1968 report written by Torsvik, Stein Rokkan and Leif Holbæk-Hanssen. The three wrote the book Medieforskning in 1972, and Torsvik also co-wrote a chapter in Rokkan's 1970 book Citizens, Elections, Parties and a chapter in the 1968 book Det norske samfunn. In 1978 Torsvik was promoted to docent in communication, and later promoted to professor.

References

External links
 Per Torsvik (Store norske leksikon)

1925 births
1998 deaths
Norwegian political scientists
Norwegian mass media scholars
Academic staff of the University of Oslo
Academic staff of the University of Bergen
20th-century political scientists